Léon Antoine Lucien Couturier (29 December 1842 in Mâcon – 21 December 1935 in Neuilly-sur-Seine) was a French painter in the Naturalistic style, who specialized in maritime and military subjects.

Biography 
His father was a merchant. He was originally admitted to the École nationale des beaux-arts de Lyon in 1860, then moved to Paris in 1864 to serve an apprenticeship in the studios of Alexandre Cabanel. In the Franco-Prussian War, he helped defend the barricades during the Siege of Paris. This experience inspired his first series of paintings devoted to military life. A holiday in North Africa inspired a similar series of works devoted to the Colonial Troops.

Beginning in 1880, he devoted himself almost exclusively to painting the ships and sailors of the French Navy, which earned him official recognition. He was appointed a "Peintre de la Marine" in 1890 and awarded the Légion d'honneur in 1897. Later, he sketched the French soldiers of World War I. Towards the end of his life, he abandoned naval subjects in favor of fishing and fishermen. He exhibited regularly at the Salon.

He also worked as an illustrator, contributing to three volumes of poetry by "Yann Nibor" (Jean Albert Robin, 1857-1947) "The Sailor Poet" of Brittany; La Marine Française by the military historian  (1893) and La Guerre Fatale France-Angleterre by "Capitaine Dirant" (Émile Driant, 1900, 2 vols.). Also adept at engraving, he reproduced many of his works to be distributed as lithographs. One of his more unusual projects involved designing menus for the official dinner hosted by President Félix Faure in honor of Tsar Nicholas II and the Tsarina in 1896. Several illustrations in anarchist publications of the 1900s (including Les Temps Nouveaux of Jean Grave) are attributed to him, but that is generally believed to be incorrect, or they were used without permission.

References

Further reading
 René Valentine: Misères de deux jeunesses 1914–1917 et 1939–1945. Muller, Issy-les-Moulineaux, 2001, .
 Wilfried Zeisler: "Figurations l'alliance franco-russe. Tableaux de marines autour de 1900", In: Histoire de l'art, Vol.55 (2004), pgs.97–107, ISSN 0992-2059

External links

 ArtNet: More works by Couturier
 Illustrations digitalized at the Base Joconde
 L'École des tambours  (Drum School)
 Marche forcée dans le Sud Oranais  (Forced March in the South Oran)
 Branle-bas de combat à bord de l'Amiral-Duperré  (All Hands to Battle Aboard the FNS Admiral Duperré)
 Le Dimanche à bord  (Sunday on Board)
 Abandonné  (Abandoned)
 L'escadre française venue de Cherbourg à la rencontre du tsar escorte et salue les yachts impériaux russes, 5 octobre 1896  (The French squadron coming from Cherbourg to Greet and Escort the Imperial Russian Yachts)

1842 births
1935 deaths
19th-century French painters
20th-century French painters
20th-century French male artists
French male painters
French marine artists
Military art
People from Mâcon
19th-century French male artists